Hestiochora queenslandensis is a moth of the family Zygaenidae. It is found in Australia from south-eastern Queensland and northern New South Wales.

The length of the forewings is 7.5–9 mm for males and 8.5–10 mm for females. There are at least two generations per year.

External links
Australian Faunal Directory
Zygaenid moths of Australia: a revision of the Australian Zygaenidae

Procridinae
Moths described in 2005